Heiko van Staveren (born 21 October 1942) is a Dutch field hockey player. He competed in the men's tournament at the 1968 Summer Olympics.

References

External links
 

1942 births
Living people
Dutch male field hockey players
Olympic field hockey players of the Netherlands
Field hockey players at the 1968 Summer Olympics
People from Breukelen
Sportspeople from Utrecht (province)